Molly Manning Walker is a cinematographer and director based in London and graduate of the NFTS. She is most noted for her 2020 short film Good Thanks, You? which was selected at the International Critics' Week in Cannes. Her grad film  took Bronze at the Student Academy Awards, and Molly was nominated at Camerimage in 2019.

Molly's debut feature is in development with Film4. Molly is represented for directing by Independent Talent.

Filmography

References

External links
Good thanks, you? on IMDB
Good thanks, you? (Full Film) on Vimeo

1993 births
Living people
Alumni of Bournemouth University